Dmitri Kutejnikov (Russian: Дмитрий Ефимович Кутейников; 1766–1844), born into a Don Cossacks noble family and was a Russian full general in time of Napoleonic Wars. He was a hero of Battle of Kinburn (1787). Kuteinikov served in wars against France and Turkey, was in a Russian expedition to India in 1800. In Patriotic War of 1812 was at Borodino, Battle of Maloyaroslavets and Battle of Berezina.

References

The Dictionary of Russian Generals in Napoleonic Wars. 

1766 births
1844 deaths
Russian commanders of the Napoleonic Wars
Don Cossacks
Cavalry commanders
Recipients of the Order of St. George of the Third Degree